John Havemeyer Tilton Jr (April 25, 1951 – May 6, 2017) was an American art dealer, based in New York City.

He was born in Littleton, New Hampshire, the son of a father who had studied art at Yale University, designed Christmas cards, and served for many years in the New Hampshire Legislature.

He was educated at Tilton School (no family connection) and received a bachelor's degree in business from Babson College in 1974.  Next, after taking some graduate courses in business at the University of New Hampshire with a direction towards banking, he withdrew from his studies. He then set forth to New York City where a family friend, Betty Parsons, who was known for her early championing of the Abstract Expressionists, including Jackson Pollock and Mark Rothko, had her renowned gallery on 57th Street in Manhattan. He started there as an assistant and worked at the gallery from 1976 to 1982. After Parsons' death in 1982 he took over the space, converting it into his own establishment, the Jack Tilton Gallery. In the early 1990s he moved the gallery to Greene Street, in the SoHo neighborhood of Manhattan.  Then in 1999 he partnered with Bennett and Julie Roberts to open the gallery Roberts & Tilton in Los Angeles, California.  Later Tilton's growing interest in Chinese contemporary art led he to start "The China Project" an artist's residency in Tong Zhoa, PRC.  In 2005 he relocated his Soho situated gallery to the Upper East Side on East
76th st. where Franklin Roosevelt and Eleanor Roosevelt were wed.

Tilton was known for cultivating young talent, and promoting emerging artists. He played an important role in the careers of artists Marlene Dumas, Kiki Smith, David Hammons, Francis Alÿs, Glenn Ligon, Nicole Eisenman, and Fred Holland.

References

1951 births
2017 deaths
People from Littleton, New Hampshire
People from Manhattan
Babson College alumni
American art dealers
Tilton School alumni